Thornbrough is a civil parish in the Hambleton District of North Yorkshire, England. The population of the civil parish was estimated at 20 in 2014.

References 

Civil parishes in North Yorkshire
Hambleton District